Fraxinus angustifolia 'Pendula Vera', or true weeping narrow-leafed ash, is a weeping tree and a cultivar of Fraxinus angustifolia subsp. angustifolia, the Narrow-leafed Ash. It was first mentioned by Beissner, Schelle & Zabel  in 1903. No trees are known to survive of this cultivar.

Description
A strongly weeping tree with a leader and with perpendicular branches forming a dome shape. More pendulous then the well known 'Pendula'

Accessions
This cultivar used to be cultivated in Germany. No specimens are known to survive.

Synonymy
Fraxinus lentiscifolia f. pendula-vera Beissner, Schelle & Zabel (1901), nom. nud. [as f. pendula vera]

References

External links

angustifolia 'Pendula Vera'
Weeping trees
Extinct cultivars